Declare a New State! is the debut studio album by American Indie pop band the Submarines. It was released on March 14, 2006 on the Canadian Nettwerk label. The album was mastered by a friend, Jeff Lipton of Peerless Mastering, as a wedding present for band members John Dragonetti and Blake Hazard. "Modern Inventions" was used in the ending credits of the short-lived MTV series, Good Vibes.

Track listing

Personnel 

John Dragonetti - Composer, Engineer
Blake Hazard - Composer
Peter Bradley Adams – Wurlitzer
David Michael Curry – Viola
Joe Klompus – Bass Guitar
Jeff Lipton – Mastering Engineer

References

External links 
 Official band website
 Official record label website

2006 albums
The Submarines albums
Nettwerk Records albums